Open Canyon is located in Grand Teton National Park, in the U. S. state of Wyoming. The canyon was formed by glaciers which retreated at the end of the last glacial maximum approximately 15,000 years ago, leaving behind a U-shaped valley. Open Canyon is situated between Mount Hunt, Prospectors Mountain and Coyote Lake which are at the head of the canyon. The canyon is accessed by way of the Open Canyon Trail.

See also
Canyons of the Teton Range
Geology of the Grand Teton area

References

Canyons and gorges of Grand Teton National Park